Grover Salman Wormer (August 9, 1821 – January 26, 1904) was a Union Army officer during the American Civil War.

Grover Wormer was born at Auburn, New York, on August 9, 1821. His father was a soldier from Massachusetts who fought in the War of 1812. Wormer was a steamboat builder before the Civil War.

Wormer served with the Stanton Guards (Michigan) as a captain, mustered out September 25, 1862, 8th Michigan Volunteer Cavalry Regiment as lieutenant colonel, October 3, 1862, and 30th Michigan Volunteer Infantry Regiment as colonel, November 21, 1864. He was mustered out of the volunteers on June 30, 1865.

On March 23, 1867, President Andrew Johnson nominated Wormer for appointment to the grade of brevet brigadier general of volunteers, to rank from March 13, 1865, and the United States Senate confirmed the appointment on March 28, 1867.

After the war, Wormer was a merchant in Detroit, Michigan. He died in Detroit on January 26, 1904. He is buried at Elmwood Cemetery.

References

See also

List of American Civil War brevet generals (Union)

Union Army colonels
People of Michigan in the American Civil War
1821 births
1904 deaths
Burials at Elmwood Cemetery (Detroit)